The Danish Cup (also known as the Metal Final4) is the national ice hockey cup in Denmark. It was first played in the 1988-89 season.

Champions
2020-21: SønderjyskE Ishockey
2019-20: Frederikshavn White Hawks
2018-19: Rungsted Seier Capital
2017-18: Aalborg Pirates
2016-17: Rungsted Seier Capital
2015-16: Odense Bulldogs
2014-15: Herning Blue Fox
2013-14: Aalborg Pirates
2012-13: SønderjyskE Ishockey
2011-12: Herning Blue Fox
2010-11: SønderjyskE Ishockey
2009-10: SønderjyskE Ishockey
2008-09: Odense Bulldogs
2007-08: Rødovre Mighty Bulls
2006-07: Aalborg Pirates
2005-06: Odense Bulldogs
2004-05: Rungsted Seier Capital
2003-04: Rungsted Seier Capital
2002-03: Odense Bulldogs
2001-02: Frederikshavn White Hawks
2000-01: not contested
1999-2000: Rungsted Seier Capital
1998-99: Frederikshavn White Hawks
1997-98: Herning Blue Fox
1996-97: not contested
1995-96: Herning Blue Fox
1994-95: not contested
1993-94: Herning Blue Fox
1992-93: Esbjerg IK
1991-92: Esbjerg IK
1990-91: Herning Blue Fox
1989-90: not contested
1988-89: Esbjerg IK

References

External links
 Danish Ice Hockey Federation

Ice hockey competitions in Denmark
National ice hockey cup competitions in Europe